Drought Season 2 is a collaboration album between American rappers Berner & The Jacka, the second album of their Drought Season series. It did not match the success of the first volume, but it still peaked at #66 on the R&B/Hip-Hop Albums chart. The album includes guest appearances from Killa Tay & Messy Marv, among other artists.

Music videos have been filmed for the songs "Colder Blood" featuring Fam Syrk and "Traffickin'" featuring Lee Majors & Fed-X.

Track listing

References

2009 albums
Collaborative albums
The Jacka albums
SMC Recordings albums
Sequel albums